Carol Porter was the Democratic nominee in the 2010 election for Lieutenant Governor of Georgia.

Carol Porter would have become the first female Lieutenant Governor of Georgia if she had won election in 2010. The election for Lieutenant Governor of Georgia took place on November 2, 2010, at the same time as the election for Governor—an office for which her then-husband DuBose Porter was running—although the offices are elected independently. Porter defeated her challenger, Tricia Carpenter McCracken, in the Democratic party primary held on July 20, 2010, while her husband lost the primary for Governor of Georgia.

In the 2010 November general election, Mrs. Porter was defeated by Republican incumbent Lieutenant Governor Casey Cagle.

Carol was the wife of former Georgia State Representative DuBose Porter and general manager of nine newspapers in middle Georgia. The Porters have four sons.  After the 2010 Election, the Porters divorced and Carol subsequently remarried Winburn "Brother" Stewart, a Republican.  Her Twitter feed now refers to her as "Carol Dodd Stewart".

References

External links 
 http://www.peachpundit.com/2010/02/25/carol-porter-enters-race-for-lieutenant-governor/

Georgia (U.S. state) Democrats
Living people
Year of birth missing (living people)